Robert Peter Aguilar (April 15, 1931 – December 2, 2020) was a former United States district judge of the United States District Court for the Northern District of California.

Education and career

Born in Madera, California, Aguilar received a Bachelor of Arts degree from the University of California, Berkeley in 1954 and pursued legal studies at the University of California, Hastings College of the Law graduating without a law degree in 1959. He was in private practice in San Jose from 1960 to 1979, and was then a Superior Court Judge in Santa Clara County, California from 1979 to 1980.

Federal judicial service

On April 3, 1980, President Jimmy Carter nominated Aguilar to a new seat on the United States District Court for the Northern District of California created by 92 Stat. 1629. Aguilar was confirmed by the United States Senate on June 18, 1980, and received his commission the same day.

Allegations of misconduct

In 1989, he was indicted for racketeering and obstruction of justice. Specifically, it was alleged that Aguilar, at the request of Abe Chapman (a convicted narcotics trafficker), tried to influence another judge, Judge Stanley A. Weigel, on behalf of Michael Rudy Tham, a former Teamsters official who was appealing an embezzlement case against him. On March 19, 1990, the case ended in acquittal on Obstruction, and in a mistrial on the other counts. He was retried over the summer and convicted on five counts. and sentenced to six months in prison, 1,000 hours of community service and fined $2,000 on conviction of unlawfully disclosing a Government wiretap and obstructing justice by lying to Federal agents about it. He continued to be out on bail while his appeals took place and refused to resign. In 1993, he faced impeachment proceedings, but they were put on hold when the conviction was overturned the following year. For this reason, he was able to assume senior status on April 15, 1996, but chose to retire two months later on June 24, 1996.

Post judicial service

Aguilar engaged in the private practice of law in Santa Clara County, from the time of his retirement from the federal bench until 2015, when he retired from the bar. He died on December 2, 2020, aged 89.

See also
List of Hispanic/Latino American jurists

References

Sources
 
Selection and confirmation of Federal judges : hearing before the Committee on the Judiciary, United States Senate, Ninety-sixth Congress, first session ... pt.6 (1980) 

1931 births
2020 deaths
20th-century American judges
California lawyers
California state court judges
Hispanic and Latino American judges
Judges of the United States District Court for the Northern District of California
Superior court judges in the United States
United States district court judges appointed by Jimmy Carter
University of California, Berkeley alumni
University of California, Hastings College of the Law alumni
People from Madera, California